The Burkina Faso women's national football team represents Burkina Faso in international women's football. It is governed by the Burkinabé Football Federation. It played its first match on 2 September 2007 in Ouagadougou against Niger and won 10–0, the best result till today. Its next matches were against Niger (5–0) and Mali (2–4).

In the 2014 African Women's Championship qualification against Ghana, Burkina Faso lost by 6–0 on aggregate. Tunisia beat them 2–0 on aggregate in the 2016 Africa Women Cup of Nations qualification. The tie of Burkina Faso and Gambia in the 2018 qualifying tournament was a 3–3 draw on aggregate; Gambia won 5–3 on penalties.

The Burkina Faso women's national football team play their home matches at the Stade du 4 Août.

History
Its first official match took place on September 2, 2007 against Niger in Ouagadougou.
Burkina Faso qualified for the first major competition in its history by winning the second round of qualifying for the 2022 African Women's Cup of Nations against Guinea-Bissau on 23 February 2022.

Results and fixtures

The following is a list of match results in the last 12 months, as well as any future matches that have been scheduled.

Legend

2022
 

 

Source : global sport

Coaching staff

Current coaching staff

Manager history

  Adama Dembéle (2007–2021)
  Pascal Sawadogo (2021–)

Players

Current squad
The following list is th final squad for 2022 Africa Women Cup of Nations in June 2022 match in June 2022. 
 Caps and goals accurate up to and including 30 October 2021.

Recent call-ups
The following players have been called up to a Burkina Faso squad in the past 12 months.

Previous squads

Africa Women Cup of Nations
2022 Women's Africa Cup of Nations squads

Records

Active players in bold, statistics correct as of 2020.

Most capped players

Top goalscorers

Competitive record

FIFA Women's World Cup

Olympic Games

*Draws include knockout matches decided on penalty kicks.

Africa Women Cup of Nations

African Games

WAFU Women's Cup record

Honours

All−time record against FIFA recognized nations
The list shown below shows the Djibouti national football team all−time international record against opposing nations.
*As of xxxxxx after match against  xxxx.
Key

Record per opponent
*As ofxxxxx after match against  xxxxx.
Key

The following table shows Djibouti's all-time official international record per opponent:

See also

Sport in Burkina Faso
Football in Burkina Faso
Women's football in Burkina Faso
Burkina Faso women's national under-20 football team
Burkina Faso women's national under-17 football team
Burkina Faso men's national football team

References

External links
Official website
FIFA profile

 
African women's national association football teams